Calapor is a 2013 Bollywood thriller film produced by A. Durga Prasad and by directed by Dinesh P. Bhonsle. The film is a taut thriller, set in the backdrop of a jail. It is a modern story of reformation. The film provokes thoughts about the nature of human being while infusing hope that there is good in every human being. The film is slated for 2 August 2013 release. The Song "Bindaas" was choreographed by Jeet Singh.

Plot
When a reluctant Jyotsna, an artiste with her assistant Ragini arrive in Calapor Central Jail to conduct an art program for prison inmates, initiated by a very sincere and committed reformist Jail Superintendent, Karunakar, the agonizing past of a criminal husband who cheated her and a delinquent son who ran away, returns to torment her. With adversity comes an opportunity; a second chance that Jyotsna as a mother cannot afford to lose or fail to succeed.

Cast
 Priyanshu Chatterjee
 Rituparna Sengupta
 Raghubir Yadav
 Harsh Chhaya
 Subbaraju
 Aziz Naser
 Binny Sharma
 Aakash Sharma
 Hemant Gopal
 Anjan Srivastav
 Vinod Anand
 Minaxi Martins
 Kumar shivam
Ghanshyam srivastva

Soundtrack

References

External links
 

2013 films
2010s Hindi-language films
Films scored by Arjuna Harjai
Films directed by Dinesh P. Bhonsle